Julie Smith (born 19 November 1982)   is a Paralympian athlete from Australia competing mainly in category T46 sprint events.

She competed in the 2008 Summer Paralympics in Beijing, China.  There she won a bronze medal in the women's 200 metres - T46 event and finished fourth in the women's 100 metres - T46 event

References

External links
 

1982 births
Paralympic athletes of Australia
Athletes (track and field) at the 2008 Summer Paralympics
Paralympic bronze medalists for Australia
Living people
Medalists at the 2008 Summer Paralympics
Paralympic medalists in athletics (track and field)
Australian female sprinters
21st-century Australian women
20th-century Australian women